The 2022 African Badminton Championships was the continental badminton championships to crown the best players and teams across Africa. The tournament was held at the Lugogo Arena in Kampala, Uganda, from 18 to 20 February 2022.

Medalists

Medal table

Tournament 
The 2022 African Badminton Championships is a continental tournament to crown the best players in Africa.

Venue 
This tournament was held at the Lugogo Arena in Kampala, Uganda.

Point distribution
The individual event of this tournament is graded based on the BWF points system for the BWF International Challenge event. Below is the table with the point distribution for each phase of the tournament.

Men's singles

Seeds

 Adham Hatem Elgamal (semi-finals)
 Anuoluwapo Juwon Opeyori (champion)
 Ahmed Salah (quarter-finals)
 Youcef Sabri Medel (quarter-finals)
 Ruan Snyman (second round)
 Brian Kasirye (final)
 Aatish Lubah (second round)
 Mohamed Abderrahime Belarbi (second round)

Finals

Top half

Section 1

Section 2

Bottom half

Section 3

Section 4

Women's singles

Seeds

 Doha Hany (final)
 Nour Ahmed Youssri (champion)
 Jana Ashraf (withdrew)
 Halla  Bouksani (third round)
 Deidre Laurens Jordaan (quarter-finals)
 Linda Mazri (second round)
 Yasmina Chibah (quarter-finals)
 Diane Olivier (second round)

Finals

Top half

Section 1

Section 2

Bottom half

Section 3

Section 4

Men's doubles

Seeds 

 Koceila Mammeri / Youcef Sabri Medel (champion)
 Adham Hatem Elgamal / Ahmed Salah (final)
 Mohamed Abderrahime Belarbi / Adel Hamek (semi-finals)
 Abdelrahman Abdelhakim / Mohamed Mostafa Kamel (semi-finals)

Finals

Top half

Section 1

Section 2

Bottom half

Section 3

Section 4

Women's doubles

Seeds 

 Fadilah Mohamed Rafi / Tracy Naluwooza (first round)
 Mounib Celia / Tanina Violette Mammeri (quarter-finals)
 Madeleine Carene Leticia Akoumba Ze / Maeva Princia Gertrude Anamba (first round)
 Nour Ahmed Youssri / Doha Hany (semi-finals)

Finals

Top half

Section 1

Section 2

Section 3

Section 4

Mixed doubles

Seeds 

 Adham Hatem Elgamal / Doha Hany (quarter-finals)
 Jarred Elliott / Amy Ackerman (final)
 Tejraj Pultoo / Kobita Dookhee (quarter-finals)
 Robert White / Deidre Laurens Jordaan (second round)

Finals

Top half

Section 1

Section 2

Bottom half

Section 3

Section 4

References

External links 
 Individual result

African Badminton Championships
African Badminton Championships
African Badminton Championships
African Badminton Championships
Badminton tournaments in Uganda
African Badminton Championships